Unionville Municipal Airport  is a city-owned, public-use airport located three nautical miles (6 km) north of the central business district of Unionville, a city in Putnam County, Missouri, United States. It was previously known as Municipal Airport and was also known as Unionville Airport.

Facilities and aircraft 
Unionville Municipal Airport covers an area of 62 acres (25 ha) at an elevation of 1,046 feet (319 m) above mean sea level. It has one runway designated 17/35 with an asphalt surface measuring 2,805 by 49 feet (855 x 15 m).

For the 12-month period ending July 31, 2009, the airport had 1,610 aircraft operations, an average of 134 per month: 99% general aviation and 1% military. At that time there were four aircraft based at this airport, all single-engine.

References

External links 
  at Missouri DOT airport directory
 Aerial image as of March 1997 from USGS The National Map
 

Airports in Missouri
Buildings and structures in Putnam County, Missouri